Woolton Hill is a village in Hampshire, England, in the civil parish of East Woodhay.

History
The area was farmland, woodland and scattered houses until the mid-18th century, when the new church was built (as a 'daughter church' to the much older ecclesiastical parish of East Woodhay). The village grew rapidly during and since the 1950s and is now larger (in population terms) than the neighbouring and contiguous village of Highclere. Due to the village's proximity to the A34 road it was the scene of many demonstrations during "the third battle of Newbury" when the Newbury bypass was being built in the 1990s.

Transport
There are bus services to Newbury and Andover. Woodhay railway station used to serve the village on the Didcot, Newbury and Southampton Railway until the line's closure in the 1960s. The disused railway line became, in part, the route for the A34 Newbury bypass.

Governance
The village is within the civil parish of East Woodhay and the East Woodhay ward of Basingstoke and Deane Borough Council. The borough council is a non-metropolitan district of Hampshire County Council.

Amenities
The village has St Thomas' CofE Infant School and Woolton Hill Junior School.

To the east/north-east of the village is an area of woodland known as "The Chase" which is managed by the National Trust. The Chase was significantly altered in 2010–2011, to return it to a nature reserve as per its original gift terms. A local watercourse runs through The Chase and has been dammed to form a small lake in the north-eastern end. There is an asphalted car-park. The chase is bounded by the A34 (Newbury bypass) to the north-east.

Landmarks 
Gainsborough Stud, owned by Mohammed bin Rashid Al Maktoum (ruler of Dubai) is in Woolton Hill. The stud's land covers a large area in the village.

References

External links

 Woolton Hill community
 East Woodhay parish council

Basingstoke and Deane
Villages in Hampshire